Botryorhiza is a genus of rust fungi in the Chaconiaceae family. The genus is monotypic, containing the single species Botryorhiza hippocrateae, which grows on Hippocratea plants in Brazil and the Caribbean.

References

External links
 

Pucciniales
Monotypic Basidiomycota genera
Fungi of South America
Taxa described in 1917